Rittenhouse Square is a neighborhood, including a public park, in Center City Philadelphia. Rittenhouse Square often specifically refers to the park, while the neighborhood as a whole is referred to simply as Rittenhouse. The park is one of the five original open-space parks planned by William Penn and his surveyor Thomas Holme during the late 17th century.

The neighborhood is among the highest-income urban neighborhoods in the country. Together with Fitler Square, the Rittenhouse neighborhood and the square comprise the Rittenhouse–Fitler Historic District.

Rittenhouse Square Park is maintained by the non-profit group The Friends of Rittenhouse Square. The square cuts off 19th Street at Walnut Street and also at a half-block above Manning Street. Its boundaries are 18th Street to the east, Walnut St. to the north, Rittenhouse Square West (a north–south boundary street), and Rittenhouse Square South (an east–west boundary street), making the park approximately two short blocks on each side.

History 
Originally called Southwest Square, Rittenhouse Square was renamed in 1825 after David Rittenhouse, a descendant of the first paper-maker in Philadelphia, the German immigrant William Rittenhouse. William Rittenhouse's original paper-mill site is known as Rittenhousetown, located in the rural setting of Fairmount Park along Paper Mill Run. David Rittenhouse was a clockmaker and friend of the American Revolution, as well as a noted astronomer; a lunar crater is named after him.

In the early nineteenth century, as the city grew steadily from the Delaware River to the Schuylkill River, it became obvious that Rittenhouse Square would become a highly desirable address. James Harper, a merchant and brick manufacturer who had recently retired from the United States Congress, was the first person to build on the square, buying most of the north frontage, erecting a stately townhouse for himself at 1811 Walnut Street (c. 1840). Having thus set the patrician residential tone that would subsequently define the Square, he divided the rest of the land into generously proportioned building lots and sold them. Sold after the congressman's death, the Harper house became the home of the exclusive Rittenhouse Club, which added the present facade in c. 1901.

From 1876 to 1929, Rittenhouse Square was home to several wealthy families including Philadelphia Railroad president, Alexander Cassatt; real estate owner, William Weightman; department store founder, John Wanamaker; Philadelphia planning commission director Edmund Bacon and his son, actor Kevin Bacon and several others. Elegant architecture like churches and clubs were constructed by John Notman and Frank Furness. The year 1913 brought more changes to the Square's layout when the French architect, Paul Philippe Cret redesigned parts of the Square to resemble Paris and the French gardens. These redesigns include classical entryways and stone additions to railings, pools, and fountains. After World War II, Rittenhouse added to its architecture with modern apartments, office buildings, and condominiums due to the real estate boom. Residential Rittenhouse Square historically housed Victorian mansions but are now replaced with high-rise apartments to accommodate the residents that live there. Shopping has become a popular activity with store buildings taking place of the brownstones along the streets. Historic design remains in Rittenhouse Square today, with prominent buildings in Italianate and Art Deco styles.

Journalist and author Jane Jacobs wrote about Paul Philippe Cret's additions to the park that remain there today. Rittenhouse Square has changed the least out of the Squares. Vacant lots were converted to apartments and hotels, and original mansions were replaced with apartments such as Claridge and Savoy. Jacobs focused on sharing two main ideas in Paul Cret's redesign, intricacy and centering. Compared with the other four original squares in Philadelphia, Rittenhouse Square has survived proposed alterations that may have changed both its physical layout and character.

In the mid-1900s, conflicts between homosexual and heterosexual communities were common within Center City neighborhoods. Gays and lesbians were found commonly living around Rittenhouse Square and saw the park as a safety zone for camaraderie. For gay men, the park was used as a place to find other men. Hippies and pre-Stonewall gays were also part of their own groups there.

Arts and culture

Today, the tree-filled park is surrounded by high rise residences, luxury apartments, an office tower, a few popular restaurants, a Barnes & Noble bookstore, a Starbucks that has been the center of controversy for racial discrimination, and a five-star hotel. Its green grasses and dozens of benches are popular lunch-time destinations for residents and workers in Philadelphia's Center City neighborhood, while its lion and goat statues are popular gathering spots for small children and their parents. The park is a popular dog walking destination for area residents, as was shown in the fictional film In Her Shoes. The Square was discussed in a favorable light by Jane Jacobs in her seminal work, The Death and Life of Great American Cities.

The beauty of the park is due largely to the efforts of Friends of Rittenhouse Square, a public-private partnership with Philadelphia Parks & Recreation. Landscaping, lighting, restoration of fountains and fencing—even the installation and stocking of doggie-bag dispensers—are all projects of the Friends of Rittenhouse Square.  During 2013, the 100th anniversary of architect Paul Cret's redesign of the Square, the Friends of Rittenhouse Square are working to raise record funds for a lighting and preservation initiative.  New security cameras have cut down on vandalism, park rangers have helped calm behavior in the Square, and damaged balustrades and stonework are undergoing extensive restoration.

The Rittenhouse Square neighborhood is also home to many cultural institutions, including the Curtis Institute of Music, Philadelphia Youth Orchestra, the Ethical Society, the Philadelphia Art Alliance, the Rosenbach Museum & Library, Plays & Players, the Wine School of Philadelphia and the Civil War and Underground Railroad Museum. Delancey Place is a quiet, historical street lined with Civil War-era mansions and the setting for Hollywood movies, located only two blocks south of the square.

The square is home to many works of public art. Among them is a bas-relief bust of J. William White done by R. Tait McKenzie. Billy, the goat was created by Philadelphian Albert Laessle, who also designed the Penguins statue at the Philadelphia Zoo.

Rittenhouse Square hosts dozens of events throughout the year, including some of the city's most popular happenings. Typically held in the beginning of May, the blockbuster Rittenhouse Square Spring Festival attracts tens of thousands for a celebration of the season complete with food, shopping, live entertainment and more. In the fall, hundreds of artists from around the country “Circle the Square” during the traditional Rittenhouse Square Fine Art Show. During the holidays, hundreds pack the park for the official start of the season during the Rittenhouse Square Christmas Tree Lighting, featuring more than 5,000 brilliant holiday lights. Held year round on Saturdays from 10:00am – 2:00pm, the farmer's market of Rittenhouse Square sells locally grown food from farmers across the region. Farm to City organizes the event which crowds Walnut Street with market vendors on 18th and 19th Streets.

Education
Residents are in the Albert M. Greenfield School catchment area for grades kindergarten through eight; all persons assigned to Greenfield are zoned to Benjamin Franklin High School. Previously South Philadelphia High School was the neighborhood's zoned high school.

The Curtis Institute of Music, University of the Arts, and Peirce College are all in the Rittenhouse Square neighborhood.

The Free Library of Philadelphia operates the Philadelphia City Institute on the first floor and lower level of an apartment complex at 1905 Locust Street; the apartment building is known as 220 West Rittenhouse Square .

Transportation
Rittenhouse Square is accessible via several forms of public transportation.

All SEPTA Regional Rail lines stop at Suburban Station, about six blocks north and east of the Square.

The PATCO Speedline, a rapid transit system connecting Philadelphia and Southern New Jersey, has its western terminus at 16th & Locust Sts., 2 blocks east of the Square.

The SEPTA 9, 12, 21, and 42 buses westbound run along Walnut Street. The 17 runs northbound along 20th Street and southbound along 19th Street and Rittenhouse Square West and the 2 runs northbound along 16th Street and southbound along 17th Street.

The SEPTA Subway–Surface Trolley Lines have a station at 19th and Market Streets, two blocks north of the Square. The Walnut-Locust station on the Broad Street Subway is four blocks east.

Gallery

See also

Cosmopolitan Club of Philadelphia
Delancey Place
List of parks in Philadelphia

References

External links

Rittenhouse Row website
Friends of Rittenhouse Square
Fairmount Park Commission's Rittenhouse Square site
Philadelphia Buildings, Rittenhouse Square
Albert M. Greenfield School
Rittenhouse Square (2005) documentary on Internet Archive

Municipal parks in Philadelphia
National Register of Historic Places in Philadelphia
Squares in the United States
Parks in Philadelphia
1682 establishments in Pennsylvania
1825 establishments in Pennsylvania
History of Philadelphia
 
Parks on the National Register of Historic Places in Pennsylvania